Moulins Yzeure Football 03 Auvergne, known as Moulins Yzeure Foot or just Moulins Yzeure, is a football club based in Yzeure, France. As of the 2021–22 season, it competes in the Championnat National 2, the fourth tier of the French football league system.

History 
AS Yzeure was founded in 1938.

On 4 January 2014, the club beat Lorient of Ligue 1 1–0 in the round of 64 of the Coupe de France.

In June 2016, following the bankruptcy of AS Moulins, an agreement was reached between the leaders of AS Yzeure and the leaders of the towns of Moulins and Yzeure to merge the clubs to create Moulins Yzeure Foot 03. The same year, AS Moulins was refounded.

Current squad

References

Association football clubs established in 1938
1938 establishments in France
Association football clubs established in 2016
2016 establishments in France
Sport in Allier
Football clubs in Auvergne-Rhône-Alpes